Valley Mill Farm, also known as Eddy's Mill, William Helm House, and Helm/Eddy House, is a historic home and farm located near Winchester, Frederick County, Virginia, USA. The house was built about 1820, and is a two-story, four bay, Federal style dwelling with a gable roof. It has a -story wing dated to the mid-19th century.  Also on the property are a contributing former two-story mill (c. 1820, now veterinary office), a frame two-story tenant house (c. 1890), a storage shed, and the ruins of two small, unidentified buildings.

It was listed on the National Register of Historic Places in 2006.

See also
 National Register of Historic Places listings in Frederick County, Virginia

References

External links
 

Houses on the National Register of Historic Places in Virginia
Farms on the National Register of Historic Places in Virginia
Federal architecture in Virginia
Houses completed in 1820
Houses in Frederick County, Virginia
National Register of Historic Places in Frederick County, Virginia